Lick Log Creek may refer to:

Lick Log Creek (Chattooga River tributary), a stream in Georgia
Lick Log Creek (Missouri), a stream in Missouri